Ashish Rai (born 26 November 1997) is an Indian cricketer. He made his Twenty20 debut on 18 January 2021, for Odisha in the 2020–21 Syed Mushtaq Ali Trophy. He made his List A debut on 11 December 2021, for Odisha in the 2021–22 Vijay Hazare Trophy. He made his first-class debut on 17 February 2022, for Odisha in the 2021–22 Ranji Trophy.

References

External links
 

1997 births
Living people
Indian cricketers
Odisha cricketers
Place of birth missing (living people)